Royal York Crescent is a major residential street in Clifton, Bristol. It overlooks much of the docks, and much of the city can be seen from it. It also joins Clifton Village at one end. It is one of the most expensive streets in the city.

Nos. 1–46 form a crescent which is a Grade II* listed building. Their construction started in 1791 but was not completed until 1820. Nos. 47–50, attached to the eastern end of the main crescent, are Grade II listed. The raised pavement built over vaulted cellars in front of the entire terrace, which is c.  long, is separately listed as Grade II*. Royal York Crescent is reputed to be the longest crescent in Europe.
 
Nos. 1–3 were used until 1855 as a boarding school for girls, run by Mrs Rogers and her four daughters. In 1837 the school was attended by Eugénie de Montijo, the future Empress of the French, and her sister Paca, the future Duchess of Alba.

The crescent is part of the Clifton conservation area.

References

External links
 About Bristol Suburbs: Clifton: Royal York Crescent

Houses completed in 1820
Houses in Bristol
Streets in Bristol
Grade II* listed buildings in Bristol
Crescents (architecture)
Clifton, Bristol
Georgian architecture in Bristol